Blanche Bay is a bay near Rabaul, New Britain, Papua New Guinea. The bay is named after , which surveyed the bay under the command of Captain Cortland Simpson in 1872.

Citations

References
Rottman, Gordon L. (2001), World War II Pacific Island Guide: A Geo-Military Study, Greenwood Press; Santa Barbara, CA. 

Bays of New Britain
East New Britain Province